The 1934–35 NCAA men's basketball season began in December 1934, progressed through the regular season and conference tournaments, and concluded in March 1935.

Rules changes 

Season headlines 

 Ned Irish began to promote college basketball doubleheaders  between New York City-area teams at Madison Square Garden and intersectional games there between New York City-area teams and teams from other regions. The first intersectional game — an NYU 25–18 victory over Notre Dame on December 29, 1934 — drew 16,138 fans, a world record for attendance at a college basketball game. In the next game on January 5, 1935, NYU defeated Kentucky 23–22 before another new world record crowd of 16,539. After the NYU–Kentucky game, Kentucky head coach Adolph Rupp called for the creation of a round-robin national championship college basketball tournament.
 The American Legion Bowl, promoted as a basketball game "for the national collegiate championship," took place in Atlantic City, New Jersey, at the end of the season. LSU defeated Pittsburgh 41–37 and called itself the national collegiate basketball champion for the 1934–35 season, although this assertion was unofficial.
 In February 1943, the Helms Athletic Foundation retroactively selected NYU as its national champion for the 1934–35 season.
 In 1995, the Premo-Porretta Power Poll retroactively selected NYU as its national champion for the 1934–35 season.

Conference membership changes

Regular season

Conference winners and tournaments

Statistical leaders

Awards

Consensus All-American team

Major player of the year awards 

 Helms Player of the Year: Leroy Edwards, Kentucky (retroactive selection in 1944)

Coaching changes 

A number of teams changed coaches during the season and after it ended.

References